Xanthophyllum obscurum is a tree in the family Polygalaceae. The specific epithet  is from the Latin meaning "dark", referring to the dark colour of the dried flowers and fruits.

Description
The smooth bark is pale and brown-grey. The flowers are white or purple.

Distribution and habitat
Xanthophyllum obscurum grows naturally in southern Thailand and western Malesia. Its habitat is lowland mixed dipterocarp and lower montane forests from sea-level to  altitude.

References

obscurum
Trees of Thailand
Trees of Sumatra
Trees of Malaya
Trees of Borneo
Plants described in 1874
Taxa named by Alfred William Bennett